Ceuthophilus nodulosus is a species of camel cricket in the family Rhaphidophoridae. It is found in North America.

References

nodulosus
Articles created by Qbugbot
Insects described in 1888